"We Could Be the Same" is a song by Turkish band maNga that was performed as the Turkish entry for the Eurovision Song Contest 2010, held in Oslo, Norway, and which came in second place.

There are 3 versions available on official CD single, called as Brussels (Eurovision version), Istanbul (Single version), and Stockholm (Extended version).

Selection
Throughout January it was reported that maNga had entered an intense period in preparation for Eurovision, perfecting songs for submission to TRT. In February 2010 maNga submitted three songs to TRT, who was in charge of selecting the competing Eurovision song. All songs were in English. We Could Be The Same, the selected song, was announced from TRT on 3 March.

Music video
The music video for the song was filmed on the Bosporus Strait opposite the Golden Horn on board an oil tanker. Then unknown top model Zeynep Arı appears in the video.

Charts

See also
Turkey in the Eurovision Song Contest 2010

References

External links
Official music video

Eurovision songs of Turkey
Eurovision songs of 2010
2010 singles
English-language Turkish songs
Sony Music singles
2010 songs